The table below lists the decisions (known as reasons) delivered from the bench by the Supreme Court of Canada during 2008. The table illustrates what reasons were filed by each justice in each case, and which justices joined each reason. This list, however, does not include reasons on motions. 

Reasons

Notes

References
 2008 decisions: CanLII LexUM

Reasons Of The Supreme Court Of Canada, 2008
2008